Liu Xuan (224–March 264), courtesy name Wenheng, was a prince of the state of Shu Han during the Three Kingdoms period. He was the eldest son of Liu Shan, the second and last ruler of Shu. His mother was Consort Wang (王貴人), a former servant of Liu Shan's first wife Empress Jing'ai; Lady Wang later became one of Liu Shan's concubines. Liu Xuan became crown prince in February 238. After the fall of Shu to the rival state of Wei, Liu Xuan and his surviving brothers returned to the capital, Chengdu. In March 264, Liu Xuan was killed in Chengdu by rebelling soldiers during Zhong Hui's rebellion.

See also
 Lists of people of the Three Kingdoms
 Shu Han family trees

Notes

References
 

Shu Han imperial princes
224 births
264 deaths
Heirs apparent who never acceded